Casino Pier is an amusement park situated on a pier, in Seaside Heights, New Jersey. The pier opened in 1932 and formerly extended approximately  into the Atlantic Ocean from the narrow strip of the Barnegat Peninsula, including approximately six blocks within Seaside Heights.

Casino Pier was partially destroyed in October 2012 after part of the pier collapsed into the Atlantic Ocean due to the storm surge generated by Hurricane Sandy. Park management rebuilt the pier's lower deck, and a shortened version of the pier reopened with limited rides in 2013. An expansion for the pier opened in 2017, which includes Hydrus (a Euro-Fighter roller coaster) and a Ferris wheel.

Facilities

Casino Pier was an amusement facility center featuring numerous rides, games, and concession stands. Before Hurricane Sandy, there were 38 rides on the pier, ranging from family rides to roller coasters; other attractions include a rooftop miniature golf course, a chairlift that runs the length of the Seaside Height's boardwalk north of Casino Pier, a figure 8 Go-Kart track, and numerous concession stands which serve typical boardwalk fare (pizza, cheese steaks, sausage sandwiches, ice cream, funnel cake, and lemonade).

Located in the Casino Pier Arcade, between the boardwalk and Ocean Terrace was once the historic antique carousel built by Dentzel and Looff in 1910 named the Dr. Floyd L. Moreland Carousel. This carousel first arrived in Seaside in 1928. A Wurlitzer style #146-A Military Band Organ originally built in 1923 was also included to provide the carousel's music.  The arcade currently houses the Pier Grille, a restaurant. The arcade features numerous arcade games, including claw and pusher redemption games, many popular video games, as well as classic arcade offerings such as Skee-Ball, pinball, and video poker.

The pier itself also featured several games. Some are games of chance, such as spinning wheels, but more often, the games involved a rudimentary amount of skill, such as a ring toss, basketball shoot, and Ladder Climb.

Although most of Casino Pier's offerings have been on the pier itself, additional Casino Pier recreational and concessional areas are located on the boardwalk between Grant Avenue and Sherman Avenue. Casino Pier owns a water park across the street, Breakwater Beach, which was remodeled in 2003 from the original Water Works water park that once stood on the property. Breakwater Beach incorporates numerous water slides with a heavy focus on families. Breakwater Beach has undergone several phases of reconstruction, and several slides have been rebuilt.

The antique Dentzel/Looff carousel was acquired from Casino Pier in 2017 to refurbish and relocate it. The carousel has been closed and was shut off on April 7, 2019, and the disassembly and relocation process began in November 2019. The carousel will eventually be relocated to a new building which will eventually be built specifically to house it and to be a carousel museum. The building is planned to be located next to the boardwalk between Carteret and Sampson avenues. The carousel was originally scheduled to reopen in its new location by 2021. However, the carousel is now scheduled to reopen in its new location by fall 2022.

Attractions

Current attractions

Kiddie rides 

 Boats – Classic boat-themed carousel
 Car Combo – Classic car-and-truck-themed carousel
 Dizzy Dragons – Dragon-themed tea-cups attraction
 Hot Tamales – Mexican-themed kiddie roller coaster
 Jump Around – Dune buggy themed carousel ride manufactured by Zamperla that randomly jumps and bounces as it rotates
 Motorcycles – Classic motorcycle-themed carousel
 Pony Carts – A pony cart themed carousel
 Speedway – Children's version of the classic whip ride themed to NASCAR
 Mermaid Parade – Mermaid themed "North Pole" kiddie log flume ride manufactured by Zamperla
 Elephant Express - Classic elephant themed ride manufactured by Zamperla

Family rides 

 Bumper Cars – Classic bumper cars attraction featuring music and special-effect lighting
 Crazy Cabs – a flat ride that modernizes the tea cup ride, where you are spinning in multiple directions on a platform
 Disk'O – A circular platform ride with outward-facing seating that spins riders as the platform moves back and forth along a half-pipe track
 Go-Karts – Single and double passenger go-kart vehicles that travel up to 14 mph (23 km/h)
 Ferris Wheel – A spinning Ferris wheel that takes riders 131 feet (40 m) above the Jersey shore
 Moby Dick – Horizontal platform ride that elevates and descends quickly as it rotates vertically
 Musik Express – Caterpillar ride that features pop music, lighting, and sound effects
 Pirates Hideaway – Pirate-themed roller coaster (many people call it a junior coaster, but it's more family-built)
 Pirate's Island – Pirate-themed maze with ropes, bridges, and a slide
 Sky Ride – Chairlift transport ride
 Super Slide – A classic slide that riders use rugs to slide on
 Surf Shack – Surfer-themed funhouse obstacle course
 Tilt-A-Whirl – Classic Tilt-A-Whirl platform ride
 Wave Swinger – A tilting swing ride that swings riders in a circle as they elevate and descend
Xolo Loca-A family spinning roller coater manufactured by SBF Visa Group

Thrill rides 
 
 Centrifuge – an indoor scrambler with lights and interior effects adding to the experience
 Hydrus – a Euro-Fighter Roller coaster manufactured by Gerstlauer with a 97 degree drop
 Shore Shot – Drop tower ride that shoots riders 125 feet (38 m) into the air at 45 mph (72 km/h) producing both positive and negative g-force
 Skycoaster – Swing-style ride that drops riders from 109 feet (33 m) reaching speeds up to 80 mph (130 km/h)
 Skyscraper – A Gravity Works, Inc. Windmill-type attraction that rapidly spins riders 170 feet (52 m) into the air at speeds up to 70 mph (110 km/h)
 Super Storm – Pendulum type of ride that makes a 360-degree revolution

Former attractions

Rides removed after Hurricane Sandy
 Air Race – Airplane-themed attraction in which riders experience up to 3 G's during loops and dives that reach heights of 25 feet (7.6 m)
 Crazy Bus

Rides destroyed during Hurricane Sandy

Star Jet – fell into the Atlantic Ocean during Hurricane Sandy in 2012 and was demolished in May 2013
 Wild Mouse
 Log Flume – destroyed after falling into the Atlantic Ocean during Hurricane Sandy in 2012
 Lady Bugs
 Kite Flyer
 Samba Balloons
 Kid Swing Ride
 Pharaoh's Fury
 Tornado
 Safari Train
 Funhouse
 Centrifuge - the original one got destroyed, and Casino Pier added a brand new one after the storm
 Stillwalk Manor – destroyed after falling into the Atlantic Ocean during Hurricane Sandy in 2012
 Rock Wall
 Rock N' Roll
 Enterprise (ride)
 Musik Express – the original one got destroyed, and Casino Pier added a brand new one after the storm
 Tilt a Whirl – the original one got destroyed, and Casino Pier added a brand new one after the storm

Rides removed before Hurricane Sandy

Jet Star (roller coaster operated from 1970 to 2000)
Inverter
Sling Shot
Himalaya
Power Surge
Graviton
Flying Bobs
Wizards Cavern

References

External links

Casino Pier official website
Casino Pier Photo Gallery

Amusement parks in New Jersey
Buildings and structures in Ocean County, New Jersey
Piers in New Jersey
1932 establishments in New Jersey
Tourist attractions in Ocean County, New Jersey
Rebuilt buildings and structures in the United States
Seaside Heights, New Jersey